In classical mechanics, a constraint on a system is a parameter that the system must obey. For example, a box sliding down a slope must remain on the slope. There are two different types of constraints: holonomic and non-holonomic.

Types of constraint

First class constraints and second class constraints
Primary constraints, secondary constraints, tertiary constraints, quaternary constraints.
Holonomic constraints, also called integrable constraints, (depending on time and the coordinates but not on the momenta) and Nonholonomic system
Pfaffian constraints
Scleronomic constraints (not depending on time) and rheonomic constraints (depending on time).
Ideal constraints: those for which the work done by the constraint forces under a virtual displacement vanishes.

References

Classical mechanics
fa: دستگاه‌های مقید